Spinach (Spinacia oleracea) is a leafy green flowering plant native to central and western Asia. It is of the order Caryophyllales, family Amaranthaceae, subfamily Chenopodioideae. Its leaves are a common edible vegetable consumed either fresh, or after storage using preservation techniques by canning, freezing, or dehydration. It may be eaten cooked or raw, and the taste differs considerably; the high oxalate content may be reduced by steaming.

Spinach may overwinter in temperate regions.

In 2018, world production of spinach was 26.3 million tonnes, with China alone accounting for 90% of the total.

Etymology

Originally from Persian aspānāḵ, entering into the European languages by way of Latin, which received it from Arabic.
The Hindi word “Palak” also has its roots in Persian. The English word "spinach" dates to the late 14th century from espinache (French: épinard).

Taxonomy
Common spinach (S. oleracea) was long considered to be in the family Chenopodiaceae, but in 2003 that family was merged into the Amaranthaceae in the order Caryophyllales. Within the family Amaranthaceae sensu lato, Spinach belongs to the subfamily Chenopodioideae.

Nutrients

Raw spinach is 91% water, 4% carbohydrates, 3% protein, and contains negligible fat. In a  serving providing only 23 calories, spinach has a high nutritional value, especially when fresh, frozen, steamed, or quickly boiled. It is a rich source (20% or more of the Daily Value, DV) of vitamin A, vitamin C, vitamin K, magnesium, manganese, iron and folate. Spinach is a moderate source (10-19% of DV) of the B vitamins, riboflavin and vitamin B6, vitamin E, calcium, potassium, and dietary fiber (table). Although spinach is touted as being high in iron and calcium content, and is often served and consumed in its raw form, raw spinach contains high levels of oxalates, which block absorption of calcium and iron in the stomach and small intestine. Spinach cooked in several changes of water has much lower levels of oxalates and is better digested and its nutrients absorbed more completely. In addition to preventing absorption and use, high levels of oxalates remove iron from the body.

Vitamin K
A quantity of 100 g of spinach contains over four times the recommended daily intake of vitamin K (table). For this reason, individuals taking the anticoagulant warfarin – which acts by inhibiting vitamin K – are instructed to minimize consumption of spinach (as well as other dark green leafy vegetables) to avoid blunting the effect of warfarin.

History

Spinach is thought to have originated about 2,000 years ago in ancient Persia from which it was introduced to India and ancient China via Nepal in 647 AD as the "Persian vegetable". In AD 827, the Saracens introduced spinach to Sicily. The first written evidence of spinach in the Mediterranean was recorded in three 10th-century works: a medical work by al-Rāzī (known as Rhazes in the West) and in two agricultural treatises, one by Ibn Waḥshīyah and the other by Qusṭus al-Rūmī. Spinach became a popular vegetable in the Arab Mediterranean and arrived in Spain by the latter part of the 12th century, where Ibn al-ʻAwwām called it , 'the chieftain of leafy greens'. Spinach was also the subject of a special treatise in the 11th century by Ibn Ḥajjāj.

Spinach first appeared in England and France in the 14th century, probably via Spain, and gained common use because it appeared in early spring when fresh local vegetables were not available. Spinach is mentioned in the first known English cookbook, the Forme of Cury (1390), where it is referred to as 'spinnedge' and 'spynoches'. During World War I, wine fortified with spinach juice was given to injured French soldiers with the intent to curtail their bleeding.

Production, marketing, and storage

In 2020, world production of spinach was 31.0 million tonnes, with China alone accounting for 92% of the total.

Fresh spinach is sold loose, bunched, or packaged fresh in bags. Fresh spinach loses much of its nutritional value with storage of more than a few days. Fresh spinach is packaged in air, or in nitrogen gas to extend shelf life. While refrigeration slows this effect to about eight days, fresh spinach loses most of its folate and carotenoid content over this period of time. For longer storage, it is canned, or blanched or cooked and frozen.

Some packaged spinach is exposed to radiation to kill any harmful bacteria. The Food and Drug Administration approves of irradiation of spinach leaves up to 4.0 kilograys, having no or only a minor effect on nutrient content.

Spinach may be high in cadmium contamination depending on the soil and location where the spinach is grown.

In popular culture
The comics and cartoon character Popeye the Sailor Man is portrayed as gaining strength by consuming canned spinach. The accompanying song lyric is: "I'm strong to the finich (sic), 'cuz I eats me spinach." This is usually attributed to the iron content of spinach, but in a 1932 strip, Popeye states that "spinach is full of vitamin A" and that's what makes people strong and healthy.

See also

 Green leafy vegetable
 Ipomoea aquatica
 Kale
 Mountain spinach
 Palmer amaranth
 Pkhali
 Spinach dip
 Spinach in the United States
 Spinach salad
 Spinach soup
 Spanakopita
 Tetragonia tetragonioides
 White goosefoot

References

External links

 

 
Amaranthaceae
Flora of Nepal
Leaf vegetables
Plants described in 1753